Zuikaku (Japanese: 瑞鶴 "Auspicious Crane") was the second and last  built for the Imperial Japanese Navy (IJN) shortly before the beginning of the Pacific War. Her aircraft took part in the attack on Pearl Harbor that formally brought the United States into the war, and she fought in several of the most important naval battles of the war, before being sunk during the Battle of Leyte Gulf.

Zuikaku was one of six carriers to participate in the Pearl Harbor attack and was the last of the six to be sunk in the war (Akagi, Kaga, Hiryu and Sōryū in the Battle of Midway, Shōkaku in the Battle of the Philippine Sea and Zuikaku in the Battle of Leyte Gulf.)

Service history

In 1941, Zuikaku, under the command of Captain Yokokawa Ichibei, and her sister ship  comprised Carrier Division 5. On 26 November 1941, she left Hitokappu Bay for the attack on Pearl Harbor as part of the Kido Butai ("Mobile Force"). Her aircraft complement consisted of 18 Mitsubishi A6M fighters, 27 Aichi D3A dive bombers, and 27 Nakajima B5N torpedo bombers. On 7 December, she launched two waves of aircraft against American military installations on the island of Oahu. In the first wave, 25 Val dive bombers attacked Wheeler Army Airfield and five Zero fighters attacked the airbase at Kaneohe. In the second wave, 27 high-level Kate bombers attacked the airbase at Hickam Field.

Zuikakus aircraft also attacked the Australian bases at Rabaul on 20 January 1942 and Lae in New Guinea on 21 January.

Battle of the Coral Sea
In May 1942, she was assigned along with Shōkaku to support Operation Mo, the invasion of Port Moresby, New Guinea. On 8 May 1942, during the Battle of the Coral Sea, the main carrier forces located one another and launched maximum-effort raids, which passed each other in the air. Hidden by a rain squall, Zuikaku escaped detection, but Shōkaku was hit three times by bombs and was unable to launch or recover her aircraft. In return, torpedo and dive bombers from both ships hit Lexington, which was later scuttled by torpedoes from an escorting destroyer. Zuikaku was undamaged in the battle, but sustained severe losses in aircraft and aircrew. This required her to return to Japan with her sister ship for resupply and aircrew training, and neither carrier was able to take part in the Battle of Midway in June 1942, where every carrier that participated in the Pearl Harbor attack besides the two Shōkaku class ships were sunk by American carrier based aircraft.

Battle for Guadalcanal
In August 1942, commanded by Captain Tameteru Notomo, Zuikaku was dispatched as part of the First Carrier Division along with the repaired Shōkaku and the light carrier  to oppose the American offensive in the Solomon Islands. On 24 August 1942, in the Battle of the Eastern Solomons, her aircraft severely damaged the carrier . She was based at Truk for the next few months.

On 26 October 1942, in the Battle of the Santa Cruz Islands, her aircraft again damaged the repaired Enterprise, and crippled  (Hornet was abandoned after a failed scuttling attempt and later sunk by Japanese destroyers). However, Shōkaku and Zuihō were both severely damaged by American air attacks, and Zuikaku had to recover their surviving aircraft in addition to her own. Of the 110 aircraft launched by the three Japanese carriers, only 67 returned to Zuikaku.  She then returned to the home islands via Truk for training and aircraft ferrying duties.

In February 1943, she covered the evacuation of Japanese ground forces from Guadalcanal. In May, she was assigned to a mission to counterattack the American offensive in the Aleutian Islands, but this operation was cancelled after the Allied victory on Attu on 29 May 1943. Later in 1943, under the command of Captain Kikuchi Tomozo, she was again based at Truk and operated against U.S. forces in the Marshall Islands.

Battle of the Philippine Sea
In 1944, she was based at Singapore. In June, she was assigned to Operation A-Go, an attempt to repulse the Allied invasion of the Mariana Islands. On 19 June, in the Battle of the Philippine Sea,  and Shōkaku were both sunk by American submarines, leaving Zuikaku, the only survivor of Carrier Division One, to recover the Division's few remaining aircraft. On 20 June, a bomb hit started a fire in the hangar, but Zuikakus experienced damage control teams managed to get it under control, and she was able to escape under her own power. After this battle, Zuikaku was the only survivor of the six fleet carriers that had launched the attack on Pearl Harbor.

Battle off Cape Engaño

In October 1944, she was the flagship of Admiral Jisaburo Ozawa's decoy Northern Force in Operation Shō-Gō 1, the Japanese counterattack to the Allied landings on Leyte. Several of these aircraft were shot down, and the majority of the surviving aircraft did not return to the carriers, instead landing at Japanese land bases on Luzon. However, some of her aircraft made kamikaze attacks and helped sink the light carrier ; and most of the others were sent to other surviving carriers and air bases, to later sink the escort carrier  during the Battle off Samar after again using the new kamikaze tactics.

The next day, during the Battle off Cape Engaño, she launched her few remaining aircraft for combat air patrol, search, or to join the aircraft already on Luzon. She then came under heavy air attack and was hit by seven torpedoes and nine bombs. With Zuikaku listing heavily to port, Ozawa shifted his flag to the light cruiser . The order to abandon ship was issued at 13:58 and the naval ensign was lowered. Before her loss, Zuikaku was the last surviving Japanese carrier to have attacked Pearl Harbor. She was also the only Japanese fleet carrier (as opposed to a light carrier) to have been sunk by aircraft-launched torpedoes, as all others were sunk by dive bombers or submarine-launched torpedoes.

Gallery

Notes

Bibliography

External links

 Tabular record of movement from combinedfleet.com

Shōkaku-class aircraft carriers
Ships built by Kawasaki Heavy Industries
1939 ships
World War II aircraft carriers of Japan
Attack on Pearl Harbor
World War II shipwrecks in the Philippine Sea
Aircraft carriers sunk by aircraft
Maritime incidents in October 1944
Ships sunk by US aircraft
Ships sunk by aircraft during the Battle of Leyte Gulf